Stade de Bouleyres is a multi-use stadium in Bulle, Switzerland.  It is currently used mostly for football matches and is the home ground of FC Bulle.  The stadium holds 5,000 people.

Bouleyres

Buildings and structures in the canton of Fribourg
Bulle